Dongergarh is a religious tourist venue in Durg district of Chhattisgarh, India. It is a temple devoted to the devi Mata Bambelshiwari. The temple is built on a hilltop, consisting of 1765 stairs. It is 25 km from National Highway 6 and on the Mumbai-Howrah main rail line. People from the state and neighbouring states come in huge numbers to offer prayers (puja) to the deity Mata Bambelshiwari.

Hindu temples in Chhattisgarh
Buildings and structures in Durg district